Joseph Cloyd Byars (December 9, 1868 – May 17, 1954) was an American lawyer and politician who served as a member of the Virginia Senate. He ran for Congress in Virginia's 9th congressional district in 1908 and for U.S. Senate in 1930.

References

External links
 

1868 births
1954 deaths
Democratic Party Virginia state senators
20th-century American politicians